Machairasaurus is a genus of oviraptorid dinosaur which was found in the Bayan Mandahu Formation, China, dating to the late Cretaceous period.

Discovery
During the Sino-Canadian expeditions of 1988 and 1990 some skeletons of unknown oviraptorosaurians were discovered by Philip J. Currie in Inner Mongolia. Based on two of these a new genus was named and described by Nicholas R. Longrich, Currie and Dong Zhiming in 2010 with as type species Machairasaurus leptonychus. The generic name is derived from Greek , "short scimitar". The species name as a whole refers to the sabre-like claws of the hand.

The holotype, IVPP V15979, was found in layers of the Bayan Mandahu dating from the late Campanian. It mainly consists of a left frontlimb, including the lower end of the lower arm, two carpal bones and a complete hand. Also some fragmentary foot elements were present. The other find is the paratype, IVPP V15980, consisting of a very fragmentary skeleton including tail vertebrae, chevrons, ribs, phalanges of the hands, fragments of the second and fourth metatarsals and pedal phalanges.

Five oviraptorid specimens associated with a nest, the female having been found brooding near the eggs, may belong to Machairasaurus.

Description

The describers established a single autapomorphy, unique derived trait: the hand claws are very elongated and blade-like in side view, with a length four times that of the joint height. The long claws would be proof that basal oviraptorids used their hands to pull down branches; the more curved claws of more derived forms would have served to dig up roots.

Machairasaurus was in 2010 assigned to the Oviraptoridae, more precisely to the Ingeniinae. It formed a smaller clade with "Ingenia" yanshini, Heyuannia huangi, Conchoraptor gracilis, and Nemegtomaia barsboldi.

See also

 Timeline of oviraptorosaur research

References

Late Cretaceous dinosaurs of Asia
Oviraptorids
Fossil taxa described in 2010
Taxa named by Philip J. Currie